William, Bill, or Billy Phipps may refer to:
 Sir William Phips or Phipps (1651–1695), English governor of the Province of Massachusetts Bay
 William Phipps (Governor of Bombay), British governor of Bombay 1722–1729
 William Henry Phipps (1846–1924), English-born senator for the U.S. state of Wisconsin
 William Edward Phipps (1922–2018), American film and television actor
 Billy Phipps (1931–2011), American jazz baritone saxophonist and composer
 Bill Phipps (1942-2022), Canadian church leader and social justice activist

See also 
 William H. Phipps House, a historic building in Hudson, Wisconsin